is a Japanese footballer currently playing as a right back for Vissel Kobe.

Career statistics

Club
.

Notes

References

External links

1996 births
Living people
Japanese footballers
Association football defenders
J1 League players
J2 League players
J3 League players
Thespakusatsu Gunma players
Sagan Tosu players
Vissel Kobe players